No. 595 Squadron RAF was a squadron of the Royal Air Force from 1943 to 1949.

History
The squadron was formed at RAF Aberporth, Wales on 1 December 1943, from nos. 1607, 1608, 1609 and 1621 Flight for anti-aircraft co-operation duties over central and northern Wales. It operated a variety of aircraft in this role. Due to the ongoing training requirement the squadron was not disbanded at the end of the war and on 27 April 1946 it moved to RAF Fairwood Common, then on 22 October 1946 to RAF Pembrey. The squadron was disbanded at Pembrey on 11 February 1949 when it was renumbered to No. 5 Squadron RAF.

Aircraft operated

Squadron bases

See also
List of Royal Air Force aircraft squadrons

References

Notes

Bibliography

External links
 595 Squadron history on MOD site
 No 541-598 Squadron Histories
 No 511 – 598 Squadron Aircraft & Markings

Aircraft squadrons of the Royal Air Force in World War II
Military units and formations established in 1943
595 Squadron